In graph theory, a king's graph is a graph that represents all legal moves of the king chess piece on a chessboard where each vertex represents a square on a chessboard and each edge is a legal move.  More specifically, an  king's graph is a king's graph of an  chessboard. It is the map graph formed from the squares of a chessboard by making a vertex for each square and an edge for each two squares that share an edge or a corner. It can also be constructed as the strong product of two path graphs.

The neighbourhood of a vertex in the king's graph corresponds to the Moore neighborhood for cellular automata.
A generalization of the king's graph, called a kinggraph, is formed from a squaregraph (a planar graph in which each bounded face is a quadrilateral and each interior vertex has at least four neighbors) by adding the two diagonals of every quadrilateral face of the squaregraph.

In the drawing of a king's graph obtained from an  chessboard, there are  crossings, but it is possible to obtain a drawing with fewer crossings by connecting the two nearest neighbors of each corner square by a curve outside the chessboard instead of by a diagonal line segment. In this way,  crossings are always possible. For the king's graph of small chessboards, other drawings lead to even fewer crossings; in particular every  king's graph is a planar graph.

See also
 Knight's graph
 Queen's graph
 Rook's graph
 Bishop's graph
 Lattice graph

References

Mathematical chess problems
Parametric families of graphs